Yang Ye (born 26 May 1994) is a Chinese rhythmic gymnast. She competed in the group rhythmic gymnastics competition at the 2016 Summer Olympics, where the team was eliminated in the qualification round. She suffered a hip injury during the qualification round and had a surgery in September 2016 in Beijing.

In 2014 she was named an Elite Athlete of International Class by the General Administration of Sport of the People's Republic of China.

References

Living people
1994 births
Chinese rhythmic gymnasts
Gymnasts at the 2016 Summer Olympics
Olympic gymnasts of China
21st-century Chinese women